Syrian Pearl, Inc., operated as Syrian Pearl Airlines, was a short-lived private airline based in Syria. It operated domestic flights within Syria. In 2010, the airline ceased all operations.

Destinations
Syrian Pearl Airlines operated the following services (as of May 2009):

 Syria
Al Qamishli (Kamishly Airport)
Aleppo (Aleppo International Airport)
Damascus (Damascus International Airport) Base
Deir ez-Zor (Deir ez-Zor Airport)
Latakia (Bassel Al-Assad International Airport)

Fleet
2 BAe 146-300 (which are operated by Orionair)

References

External links

Defunct airlines of Syria
Defunct airlines of Asia
Airlines established in 2009
Airlines disestablished in 2010
Companies based in Damascus